John Hassell (c. 1767 – 1825) was an English painter, engraver, illustrator, and writer.

John Hassell may also refer to:
John Hassell (settler) (1788–1883), Australian pastoralist
John Frederick Tasman Hassell (1839–1919), Australian politician

See also
Jon Hassell (1937–2021), American trumpet player and composer 
John Hassall (disambiguation)